Valerie French is a former professional wrestling valet better known as Sunshine.

Professional wrestling career

Championship Wrestling from Florida (1982) 
Valerie French started in wrestling as the valet for her real life cousin Jimmy Garvin in Championship Wrestling from Florida.

World Class Championship Wrestling (1983–1986) 
French became a mainstay with World Class Championship Wrestling in 1983. She was called Sunshine and helped him in his feud with David Von Erich. Garvin received some criticism for hiding behind Sunshine when he was in trouble. Sunshine was known for constantly interfering on Garvin's behalf. David Von Erich spanked her in the middle of the ring for this same reason. On July 4, 1983, Garvin lost a match to David where he and Sunshine had to be his servants for a day. David had them doing chores on his ranch and filmed it.

Shortly after this, Garvin brought in his wife, Precious, to replace Sunshine, and they feuded. Sunshine enlisted the help of Chris Adams to help her in this feud.

In the summer of 1985, Sunshine had a brief feud against Jim Cornette that saw her pin him in a match where he had one arm tied behind his back and blindfolded. By late 1985, she was feuding with Missy Hyatt. They had many catfights that Hyatt's man John Tatum usually broke up so Sunshine enlisted Scott Casey and The Great Kabuki to help her. Kabuki turned on her and Casey in October, in a match where Kabuki teamed with The Missing Link against Scott Casey and Iceman Parsons Kabuki would attack her and The Missing Link would turn on him and The Missing Link would later to the same thing again when he would be attacked by former Manager Percy Pringle and Rick Rude she would spray perfume in Rude's eyes and The Missing Link would stop Pringle from attacking her. She would start managing him and continued her feud with Hyatt. It culminated at the Parade of Champions on May 4, 1986 where Sunshine beat Hyatt in a pig-sty mud match. She then started a feud with a woman by the name of Raven which culminated in Sunshine beating Raven in a mud wrestling match on July 4, 1986.

Sunshine also managed Lance Von Erich and reunited with Chris Adams in 1986, after Adams became babyface following a sixteen-month stint as a heel wrestler.

Universal Wrestling Federation and Wild West Wrestling (1986–1988) 
She then left for the Universal Wrestling Federation where she managed The Fabulous Freebirds. As part of the federation, she and the Freebirds feuded with The Missing Link and Dark Journey.

She left the UWF for Wild West Wrestling where she managed the team of John Tatum & Jack Victory. She also went back to managing The Missing Link. She eventually returned to the UWF, but the company was in the process of being sold to Jim Crockett Promotions. She retired shortly after that.

Personal life
She now lives in Tampa, Florida, is married and has a daughter.

References

External links
 
 World Class Wrestling profile

1962 births
21st-century American women
American female professional wrestlers
Living people
People from Cape Coral, Florida
Professional wrestlers from Florida
Professional wrestling managers and valets